A provisional constitution, interim constitution or transitional constitution is a constitution intended to serve during a transitional period until a permanent constitution is adopted. The following countries currently have,had in the past,such a constitution.

Currently in force

 Azad Kashmir — Interim Constitution of Azad Jammu and Kashmir (since 31 August 1974)
Libya — Libyan interim Constitutional Declaration (since 3 August 2011)
 Somalia — Provisional Constitution of the Federal Republic of Somalia (since 1 August 2012)
 South Sudan — Transitional Constitution of South Sudan (since 9 July 2011)
Sudan — Constitutional Charter of Sudan (since 4 August 2019)
 Rojava - Constitution of Rojava (since 29 January 2014)

In the past
 Republic of China — Provisional Constitution of the Republic of China (from 11 March 1912 to 1 June 1931)
 Czechoslovakia — Provisional Constitution (from 13 November 1918 to 6 March 1920)
 Egypt — 2011 Provisional Constitution of Egypt (from 30 March 2011 to 26 December 2012)
 Indonesia — Provisional Constitution of 1950 (from 17 August 1950 to 5 July 1959)
 Iraq — Law of Administration for the State of Iraq for the Transitional Period (from 28 June 2004 to 15 October 2005)
 Ireland — Dáil Constitution (from 21 January 1919 to 6 December 1922)
 Nepal — Interim Constitution of Nepal (from 2007- 20 September 2015)
 Islamic Republic of Pakistan - Government of India Act 1935 (August 1947 to March 11)
 Philippines — 1986 Freedom Constitution (from 1986 to 1987)
 South Africa — Interim Constitution of South Africa (from 27 April 1994 to 4 February 1997)
 Tanzania — Interim Constitution of Tanzania (from 1964 to 1977)
 Thailand — 2006 Interim Constitution of Thailand (from 1 October 2006 to 19 August 2007)
 United States — Provisional Constitution (John Brown) - Constitution for a new state John Brown (abolitionist) hoped escaped slaves would create, 1859. Never in effect.
 United States — Provisional Constitution of the Confederate States of America (from 8 February 1861 to 22 February 1862)